Haji Khan Kangarli (Persian: حاجی خان کنگرلی, Azerbaijani: Hacı xan Kəngərli, 1765—1769) was the second khan of the Nakhichevan Khanate from the Kangarli tribe, who succeeded Heydar Qoli Khan.

During his reign, the Nakhichevan Khanate weakened, he accepted dependence on Karim Khan Zand, the Shah of Iran, who invited him to Shiraz and took him prisoner for a petty crime. Rahim Khan began to rule in this khanate.

See also 
 Karim Khan Zand
 Heydar Qoli Khan

References 

18th-century rulers in Asia

Nakhichevan khans
Kangarlis